Lymnaea tomentosa hamiltoni is an extinct subspecies of freshwater snail, an aquatic gastropod mollusc in the family Lymnaeidae, the pond snails.

This species was endemic to New Zealand. The shells of these snails were found in lake marls in the southern part of the South Island.

References

Lymnaeidae
Extinct gastropods